John Francis Cunningham  OBE FRCS (25 September 1875 - 13 July 1932) was a British Ophthalmic surgeon.

References 

1875 births
1932 deaths
Fellows of the Royal College of Surgeons